Yip Kai Foon (12 June 1961 – 19 April 2017, born in Haifeng, China), also known as "Teeth Dog" and "Goosehead", was an infamous Chinese illegal immigrant turned gangster who was most active in Hong Kong from the early 1980s to 1990s. He and his gang specialised in robbing jewellery stores with assault rifles. Their weapon of choice was the AK-47 assault rifle, which they acquired from black markets hosted by triads. He is also the first person to have used an AK-47 during an armed-robbery in Hong Kong.

Early crimes
In October 1984, when he was 23, Yip led a gang of five armed mainland men into Hong Kong. They robbed two jewelry stores, King Fook Jewellery Co. Ltd on 10 October 1984 and Dickson Jewellery Co. Ltd. on 27 October 1984; they managed to obtain more than  million worth of precious items as a result. In the course of both robberies, shots were fired. An undercover policeman posed as a potential buyer for the stolen goods as part of a sting operation. During the subsequent 28 December 1984 meeting, once the policeman identified himself, Yip attempted to shoot him and a violent struggle occurred. After Yip was subdued, he was found with two handguns, later linked by ballistics to the October robberies.

Yip was convicted on four counts (two counts of handling stolen goods for each robbery, possession of firearms, and use of a firearm with intent to resist arrest) and sentenced to 18 years in prison. Yip contested the conviction, claiming that he was asked only to find a buyer for what he thought were sub-standard watches produced in local factories; his appeal was dismissed in 1987. But he escaped on 24 August 1989, when he faked appendicitis and was transferred to Queen Mary Hospital. In the toilet, he jumped his two officers with broken bottles and made off in a van parked at the hospital entrance. He hijacked the van with two occupants inside, a 37-year-old van driver and driver's 6-year-old son. While driving, he forced the driver to take off shoes and clothes so Yip could put them on. He got off at Wong Chuk Hang and left the scene by bus. He is presumed to have fled into mainland China.

On the run

AK-47 heists
On 9 June 1991, he and his gang, armed with AK-47s and pistols, robbed five goldsmiths shops on the "Golden" Mut Wah Street in Kwun Tong. They fired 54 shots at police and escaped with gold and jewelry worth  million. Many onlookers believed the gun battle was being staged for a film.

The gang was linked to a robbery of two jewelers on Tai Po Road in Sham Shui Po on 10 March 1992. During the course of that robbery, gang members fired 65 shots at police and members of the public, escaping with  million worth of jewelry.

Yip is thought to have been involved in a 6 January 1993 jewelry store robbery on Nathan Road in Mong Kok, when a gang fired 30 rounds from AK-47s, killing a woman passerby. One robber was shot by police during the chase; the others dumped his body on the street when they switched getaway cars.

Macau police suspected Yip was involved in an April 1994 armed heist of  million in gambling chips from the casino at the Hyatt Regency Hotel on Taipa.

In 1995, Yip moved his crime operation to Shenzhen, participating in the January abduction and murder of a Tianjin businessman and the November murder of a police informant.

The total worth of his stolen goods is estimated at  million (Approximately $2,576,920 US). Yip achieved notoriety by escaping police custody multiple times.

Capture and trial
His career finally came to an end on 13 May 1996 when he was arrested following a Kennedy Town gunfight with police that left him paralyzed from the waist down. At the time he had a  million reward on his head, but the two officers involved did not receive the reward. Two police officers had surprised Yip and his gang in an alley near the waterfront. Since they had just debarked from a boat, the police suspected they were illegal immigrants and asked for identification. The rest of the gang fled, but Yip pulled a gun from a bag and began shooting. During an ensuing foot pursuit, the officers testified they ordered him to drop his gun, which he refused to do, instead shooting at the officers. After his gun jammed, he was captured. He was found with a machine gun, a pistol, and 1.8 kg of explosives.

He was charged with possession of firearms and ammunition without a licence and shooting with intent to do grievous bodily harm stemming from wounds one of the officers received in the course of the arrest. While Yip was recovering from his injuries, additional charges of escaping custody and kidnapping (during the van hijack) were added stemming from his 1989 escape.

During the lead-up to the trial, a fictionalized version of Yip's life was filmed as King of Robbery, also known as Life Will Never Be Twice, starring Simon Yam and Roy Cheung), but its planned August 1996 release was delayed by court order.

Yip's trial began on 18 February 1997, with the defence claiming the police shot Yip in the back and then stole  from him. He dismissed his defence team two days later, subsequently appearing to fall asleep when given the chance to cross-examine a prosecution witness.

On 10 March 1997, he was convicted of all charges and sentenced to 41 years in prison, which consists of the 11 years he had left on his original sentence and 30 years on the new charges, to be served consecutively. The earliest year in which he could have been released was   2022.

Imprisonment and death
Yip's lawyers appealed his conviction, stating the publicity surrounding his arrest was prejudicial to the jury, but lost the appeal on 8 December 1998.

A separate appeal to reduce his sentence, based on his injuries and subsequent care, was heard in March 1999. The Court of Appeal reduced his sentence by approximately five years.

Yip subsequently went to the Court of Final Appeal seeking a reduction in his sentence based on his 'catastrophic' medical condition, but the appeal was denied.

He was married to his mainland wife in August 2003. He had been previously married (to the same woman) under a false name before his imprisonment.

Yip continued to maintain his innocence over the 1996 shootout, offering a substantial reward for a witness he alleges saw the events leading up to his arrest.

Yip converted to Christianity in March 2004.

Yip was sentenced on 11 January 2010 to an additional six months in jail for assaulting an officer at Stanley Prison on 30 April 2009. He had complained that he had been badly treated by prison guards.

On 1 April 2017, he was hospitalized at Queen Mary Hospital for cancer treatment. He died on 19 April 2017 of lung cancer.

Cultural influence
Several documentaries detail Yip's exploits and several fictional movies are adapted from his criminal history.
 The Most Dangerous Man (2010). Yim Foon portrayed by Karel Wong
 King of Robbery (1996). Chan Sing portrayed by Simon Yam
 Hong Kong's King of Thieves. Yip Kai-foon portrayed by Chan Wah
 Trivisa (2016). Yip Kwok-foon portrayed by Richie Jen

References

Notes

Bibliography

1961 births
2017 deaths
Chinese gangsters
Converts to Christianity
Deaths from lung cancer
Fugitives
Hong Kong gangsters
Jewel thieves
People from Haifeng County
Triad members